Lieutenant Colonel Horace Ellis Crouch (October 29, 1918 – December 21, 2005) was an American military aviator whose career included service with the United States Army Air Corps and United States Air Force, he was a combat veteran of World War II and the Korean War who served as one of the crewmembers on the Doolittle Raid.

Early life 

Crouch was a native of Columbia, South Carolina, he attended Columbia High School and earned a bachelor's degree in Civil Engineering from The Citadel graduating in 1940; while a cadet he also served as a member of the South Carolina Army National Guard.
Commissioned into the Army Air Corps, he became triple qualified as a Navigator, Bombardier and Radar Operator then was assigned to the 89th Reconnaissance Squadron of the 17th Bombardment Group based at Pendleton Airport,  Oregon which flew the new North American B-25 Mitchell medium bomber.

On December 5, 1941, he married Mary Epting (1919–2001), a childhood friend and high school classmate, while on their honeymoon they learned of the Japanese attack on Pearl Harbor that lead to the United States entry into World War II.

World War II and later military service 

In early 1942, Crouch was one of 80 volunteers (from an original pool of 120) chosen for a secret mission to be led by Lieutenant Colonel Jimmy Doolittle, a surprise raid on Japan conducted by 16 B-25s flown off the aircraft carrier USS Hornet (CV-8).  The "Doolittle Raiders" trained at Columbia Army Air Base in South Carolina and Eglin Field in Florida before sailing from Naval Air Station Alameda, California for Japan aboard the Hornet on April 2, 1942. Crouch served as the Bombardier, Navigator and Nose Gunner of Crew #10 flying on aircraft serial number 40-2250 which included Pilot Lt. Richard Joyce, Co-Pilot Lt. Royden Stork, Engineer/Turret Gunner Sgt. George Larkin and Gunner SSgt. Edward Horton.  After launching off the Hornet on April 18 their aircraft struck targets in Tokyo and was credited with shooting down 2 Japanese fighters, the only enemy aircraft destroyed on the mission.  After dropping their bombs, they flew on to China where the crew bailed out and were escorted to safety by local Chinese guerillas. Crouch remained in the China Burma India Theater until June 1943, serving with the 11th Bomb Squadron of the 341st Bombardment Group initially at bases in India and later at Kunming, China. After serving briefly in Japan after wars end Crouch left active duty in 1947 and joined the newly organized Air Force Reserve, he was recalled to active duty in 1948 with the newly independent United States Air Force and was assigned as Deputy State Director of the Selective Service System in Columbia, South Carolina.  He returned to flying duty as a Navigator on the Boeing B-29 Superfortress flying combat missions during the Korean War while assigned to the 307th Bomb Wing at Kadena Air Base on Okinawa. After subsequent service with the 301st Bomb Wing and 4th Air Division at Barksdale AFB, Louisiana, he was Chief of Intelligence for the 68th Bomb Wing at Lake Charles AFB, Louisiana then became qualified as an Aircraft Observer on the Boeing B-47 Stratojet.
He resigned his commission in 1957 but returned to active duty as an enlisted Photo Interpretation Specialist and Intelligence Analyst serving in Germany and Shaw AFB, South Carolina, he retired in 1962 but reverted to his highest grade of lieutenant colonel.

Later life 

Crouch was a high school math and drafting teacher at Columbia High school for another 20 years after his military service and earned a master's degree from Clemson University.  He was a member of the Doolittle Raiders Association and American Legion, his military awards included the Silver Star, Distinguished Flying Cross, Air Medal with Oak Leaf Cluster and the Republic of China Armed Forces Medal Class A 1st Grade. In 1998, he was inducted into the South Carolina Aviation Hall of Fame. He was also recipient of the Order of the Palmetto, the highest award given by the State of South Carolina. In 2014, the Doolittle Raiders were awarded a Congressional Gold Medal.

Awards and decorations

References

External links 

https://www.thestate.com/news/special-reports/state-125/article55503365.html
http://www.baltimoresun.com/news/bs-xpm-2001-09-16-0109160012-story.html
http://www.wistv.com/story/747710/doolittle-raiders-60th-anniversary-reunion-in-columbia/
https://www.postandcourier.com/patriots-point-to-mark-doolittle-raid-anniversary-friday/article_a9e79bde-23a6-11e7-94ca-a78027d42a86.html
https://airforce.togetherweserved.com/usaf/servlet/tws.webapp.WebApp?cmd=ShadowBoxProfile&type=Person&ID=173302

Further reading 

Lawson, Ted W. Thirty Seconds Over Tokyo. Dulles, Virginia: Brassey's Inc., 2003 (60th anniversary reprinted edition). .
James H. Doolittle; Carroll V. Glines. I Could Never Be So Lucky Again. . OCLC 33957079

Military personnel from South Carolina
United States Army Air Forces personnel of World War II
1918 births
2005 deaths
The Citadel, The Military College of South Carolina alumni
People from Columbia, South Carolina
Doolittle Raiders
United States Air Force colonels
United States Air Force personnel of the Korean War
United States Army Air Forces officers
Recipients of the Silver Star
Recipients of the Distinguished Flying Cross (United States)
Recipients of the Air Medal
United States Air Force officers